Sheila MacVicar is a Canadian television journalist most recently with Al Jazeera America as  the host of Compass With Sheila MacVicar and a correspondent for America Tonight.

A native of Montreal, she worked for CBS News from June 2004 until 2013 as the network's London correspondent. She has also worked as a reporter for CBC Television (1981–1990), ABC News (1990–2001) and CNN (2001–2004). From 1977 she worked at CBC affiliated stations in Calgary and Montreal.

She graduated from Carleton University in 1977 with a Bachelor of Journalism.

Awards and recognition
 Emmy Awards (3 awards)
 Peabody Award (1 award)
 One World Broadcasting Trust (media award; 1998)

Noted stories
MacVicar reported on a connection between Osama Bin Laden and Saddam Hussein on January 14, 1999 on ABC News.

External links
CBS News: Sheila MacVicar bio
Carleton University: "Carleton Grads on the Frontlines" (Spring 2002)
ABC News January 14th 1999 "Osama Bin Laden & Saddam Hussein connection"

References

Living people
Carleton University alumni
Canadian television reporters and correspondents
Canadian expatriates in England
Canadian expatriate journalists in the United States
Journalists from Montreal
Canadian women television journalists
Al Jazeera people
CBS News people
20th-century Canadian journalists
21st-century Canadian journalists
Year of birth missing (living people)
20th-century Canadian women